EPs 1991–2002 is a 5-CD box set which contains material from all 11 EPs released by British electronic music duo Autechre between 1991 and 2002 including Autechre's first EP, Cavity Job, presented for the first time on CD. The "Basscadet" remixes made by Beaumont Hannant and Seefeel are not included.

The box is made of rigid black cardboard and each CD is housed in individual gatefold cardboard slipcase.  The credit to Autechre and the titles are incised into the slipcase and the individual gatefold sleeves for the CD's.

Critical reception 

In his review, Jess Harvell (Pitchfork) called the collection "one of the better introductions to the duo's work" even though it contains a combination of "accessible" and "difficult" music. Corey Beasley (PopMatters) concurs, stating "the box could serve almost as well as an entry-point into the group’s catalog for a beginner as it would for a completionist or superfan". Gregory Heaney (Allmusic) noted the "stark, minimal, and austere" properties of the physical box set as one of its key selling points.

Track listing

References

External links 
 Discogs entry

Autechre albums
Warp (record label) compilation albums
2011 compilation albums